Dadiala Najara is a village in Batala in Gurdaspur district of Punjab State, India. The village is administrated by Sarpanch an elected representative of the village.

Demography 
, The village has a total number of 299 houses and the population of 1670 of which 908 are males while 762 are females according to the report published by Census India in 2011. The literacy rate of the village is 72.51%, lower than the state average of 75.84%. The population of children under the age of 6 years is 226 which is 13.53% of total population of the village, and child sex ratio is approximately 766 lower than the state average of 846.

See also
List of villages in India

References 

Villages in Gurdaspur district